Pharmacode, also known as Pharmaceutical Binary Code, is a barcode standard, used in the pharmaceutical industry as a packing control system.  It is designed to be readable despite printing errors. It can be printed in multiple colors as a check to ensure that the remainder of the packaging (which the pharmaceutical company must print to protect itself from legal liability) is correctly printed. This barcode is also known as Laetuscode.

For best practice (better security), the code should always contain at least three bars and should always be a combination of both thick and thin bars, (all thick bars or all thin bars do not represent a secure code).

Encoding 
Pharmacode can represent only a single integer from 3 to 131070. Unlike other commonly used one-dimensional barcode schemes, pharmacode does not store the data in a form corresponding to the human-readable digits; the number is encoded in binary, rather than decimal. The minimum barcode is 2 bars and the maximum 16, so the smallest number that could be encoded is 3 (2 narrow bars) and the biggest is 131070 (16 wide bars).
It represents colors which are on the label.

References

External links 
 Pharmacode Specification

Barcodes
Unique identifiers
Supply chain management